Madison Brengle was the defending champion, and successfully defended her title, defeating Zhu Lin in the final, 6–4, 7–5.

Seeds

Draw

Finals

Top half

Bottom half

References

Main Draw

Koser Jewelers Tennis Challenge - Singles